Highway 36 (AR 36, Ark. 36, and Hwy. 36) is a state highway in Central Arkansas. The highway begins at U.S. Highway 64 (US 64) at Hamlet and runs east through several small communities to Searcy, where it serves as the Beebe-Capps Expressway, a major crosstown arterial roadway. Following a discontinuity at US 64/US 67/US 167 (future Interstate 57 [I-57]), the highway continues east to Kensett as Wilbur D. Mills Avenue before state maintenance ends at the small community of Georgetown. This highway is maintained by the Arkansas Department of Transportation (ARDOT).

One of the original 1926 Arkansas state highways, Highway 36 was established between Hamlet to Searcy largely along its modern alignment. Extensions to Kensett in 1938 and Georgetown in 1945 established the highway's present eastern terminus. The alignment through Searcy has also changed through the years to accompany the growth of the city as a regional hub, and the increased role of US 67 in the region's transportation system.

Route description
Highway 36 begins at US 64 east of Conway in Central Arkansas near the unincorporated community of Hamlet. It runs north through rural parts of the Arkansas Valley ecoregion, passing the Liberty School Cafeteria, a historic building listed on the National Register of Historic Places, shortly north of the US 64 junction. Winding north through a sparsely populated rural area, Highway 36 serves as the southern terminus for Highway 287 in Holland and Highway 107 near Enola. Approaching the White County line, Highway 310 joins Highway 36 for a concurrency through the small town of Mount Vernon. In the town, Highway 310 turns due east; Highway 36 continues north, crossing the East Fork Cadron Creek before entering White County.

Upon entering White County, Highway 36 enters Rose Bud, a small town. Highway 36 serves as the eastern terminus of Highway 124 before again bridging the East Fork Cadron Creek. Continuing east, the route has an offset intersection with Highway 5, a major north–south highway in the region. East of Rose Bud, Highway 36 continues through rural lands predominantly used for ranching or broiler production on its way to Searcy, a regional population and economic center. Highway 36 passes unincorporated communities such as Joy and Center Hill, and junctions with (a separate section of) Highway 310, Highway 305, and Highway 320. The highway passes two NRHP properties on its way to Searcy: the Titan II ICBM Launch Complex 373-5 Site and Smyrna Methodist Church.

Upon entering Searcy, the county seat of White County, Highway 36 is known as the Beebe Capps Expressway, named for Searcy legislators Mike Beebe (who would later be elected Governor of Arkansas) and John Paul Capps, who were both instrumental in its construction. The route is a four-lane divided highway, with a two-way left turn lane (TWLTL) across most of the city. Highway 36 has an intersection with Highway 13 (Sunset Park Road / Honey Hill Road) along the western Searcy city limits before entering a residential area. In the city, Highway 36 has an intersection with US 67 Business (US 67B, Pleasure Avenue), passing Searcy Public Schools' Southwest Middle School before another intersection with US 67B (Main Street). East of the second intersection with US 67B, Highway 36 intersects Burks Drive, the entrance to Harding University, before entering an industrial area of the city and intersecting US 64/US 67/US 167 (Future I-57), a freeway providing access to Little Rock to the south and St. Louis, Missouri to the north. Highway 36 continues east to a junction with Highway 367 (Eastline Road).

The highway has a gap in the route; resuming north at the eastern side of the US 63/US 67/US 167/US 67B interchange. It runs east as Race Avenue, intersecting Highway 367 (Eastline Road) near Doniphan Lake and the Doniphan Lumber Mill Historic District and angling south to enter the small town of Kensett. Highway 36 is named Wilbur D. Mills Avenue in Kensett, the birthplace of the 38-year United States Congressman and 1972 Democratic presidential primary candidate known as "the most powerful man in Washington DC" during his time chairing the House Ways and Means Committee. Passing near Mills' longtime home, now listed as the Mills House on the NRHP, the highway serves as the northern terminus of Highway 385 (SE 1st Street), which leads to downtown Kensett. Highway 36 continues southeasterly until turning onto SE 4th Street, crossing Black Creek, and exiting Kensett. East of Kensett, Highway 36 runs east and begins paralleling the Little Red River near the Bald Knob National Wildlife Refuge (NWR) to the small town of West Point. Highway 36 serves as the northern terminus of Highway 323 (Pete's Road) before turning toward the river and downtown. Once downtown, Highway 36 turns along Front Street, paralleling the Little Red River eastbound, passing West Point City Hall and the Otha Walker Homestead and exiting town heading toward the southeast corner of White County. Passing through sparsely populated country, Highway 36 runs through Andrews and Pryor, curves around Taylor Slough, and passes Entight and the Henry Gray Hurricane Lake Wildlife Management Area (WMA) before entering the small town of Georgetown. State maintenance terminates at an intersection with Pearl Street, with the roadway continuing northeast as Dee Mears Road.

The ARDOT maintains Highway 36 like all other parts of the state highway system. As a part of these responsibilities, the Department tracks the volume of traffic using its roads in surveys using a metric called average annual daily traffic (AADT). ARDOT estimates the traffic level for a segment of roadway for any average day of the year in these surveys. As of 2018, the peak AADT on the highway (excluding concurrencies) was 24,000 vehicles per day (VPD) as Beebe-Capps Expressway in Searcy near the Sawmill Road intersection. Traffic volume drops quickly heading west, below 10,000 west of the Honey Hill Road intersection, and below 5,000 by the western city limits of Searcy. Between Rose Bud and Searcy, Highway 36 sees around 4,000 VPD, and west of Rose Bud, the highway sees around 2,000 VPD, increasing to 3,900 VPD near the western terminus. Eastbound, Highway 36 sees 19,000 VPD near downtown Searcy and around 12,000 VPD near US 67/US 167, establishing it as the second-most used entrance to the city from the freeway (behind the 21,000 using Race Avenue). Counts dropped to 4,100 VPD in Kensett, and as low as 470 VPD east of West Point.

No segment of Highway 36 has been listed as part of the National Highway System, a network of roads important to the nation's economy, defense, and mobility.

History
Highway 36 was created during the original 1926 Arkansas state highway numbering between State Road 60 (now US 64) at Hamlet and Searcy. It was extended east to Kensett around 1938, and to Georgetown around 1945. The section connecting US 67 near Doniphan to Searcy became US 67 City (US 67C, now US 67B) as part of a major realignment of US 67 in 1950. A realignment in Kensett shifted Highway 36 from Searcy Street to Marquad Avenue (today Wilbur D. Mills Avenue) on August 2, 1961. Following construction of a four-lane US 67 along the east side of Searcy, Highway 36 replaced part of US 67C through Searcy. The Highway 36 and US 67B alignment was changed again on December 5, 1991 and again on May 13, 1998.

Much of Highway 36 through Searcy closely follows the former Missouri and North Arkansas Railroad tracks. Some track section are still visible in parking lots along Mulberry Avenue.

Major intersections
Mile markers reset at some concurrencies.

See also
 
 
 List of state highways in Arkansas

References

036
Transportation in White County, Arkansas
Transportation in Faulkner County, Arkansas